Efe Bayram (born 1 March 2002) is a Turkish professional volleyball player. He is a member of the Turkey national team and a silver medallist at the 2022 European League. At the professional club level, he plays for Top Volley Cisterna.

Honours

Clubs
 CEV Challenge Cup
  2021/2022 – with Halkbank Ankara

 National championships
 2018/2019  Turkish SuperCup, with Halkbank Ankara
 2021/2022  Turkish Championship, with Halkbank Ankara

References

External links
 
 Player profile at LegaVolley.it  
 Player profile at Volleybox.net

2002 births
Living people
Sportspeople from Ankara
Turkish men's volleyball players
Turkish expatriate sportspeople in Italy
Expatriate volleyball players in Italy
Halkbank volleyball players
Outside hitters
21st-century Turkish people